Skopje Fest or Festival na zabavni melodii Skopje (Фестивал на забавни мелодии Скопје) is one of the main musical events in North Macedonia.

SkopjeFest began in 1968 in the Universal Hall in Skopje, and continued until 1980. In this short time, the festival became one of the biggest music events in Yugoslavia. Skopjefest was the place where famous Macedonian singers such as Slave Dimitrov, Zafir Hadzimanov, Nina Spirova made their performances together with eminent Yugoslav performers. Audiences enjoyed over 50 songs.

After Macedonia gained its independence peacefully from Yugoslavia, SkopjeFest was revived in 1994, and has since taken over from MakFest as North Macedonia's premier music festival.

The show involves some of North Macedonia's finest performers, singing original tracks submitted to MRT (Makedonska Radio Televizija), usually accompanied by the orchestra of MRT (excluding some of its latest editions).

It has also been used as the Macedonian national selections for the Eurovision Song Contest, since the late 1990s. The first Macedonian representative in Eurovision, was Macedonian singer Vlado Janevski who won SkopjeFest 1998 with the song "Ne Zori Zoro", for the Eurovision Song Contest 1998. This was Macedonia's first participation in the Eurovision Song Contest. Ever since, SkopjeFest has been shadowed by many controversial debates regarding the strategies behind the song selections and the lack of transparence concerning the winner. Such allegations are not new to this contest. However, they intensified as the Eurovision participation became a factor. After the decision to make SkopjeFest the National Pre-Selection round for Macedonia's representative to Eurovision, the traditional point award ceremony was eliminated and replaced by the controversial announcement of only the Top 3 places. Neither the points of the jury nor the televoting results are made public.

Up until 2002, SkopjeFest used to be the biggest musical activity in the country. However, it faced financial problems. In 2003, the festival wasn't held in order to save money for the next year when Macedonia was going to particate in the Eurovision Song Contest. In the meantime, MRT made new criteria for the national selection for the Eurovision Song Contest, the festival returned in 2004 only to celebrate the 60th anniversary of MRT. After that, financial problems increased and it wasn't organised until 2008, again as an ESC national final.

After the first details about selecting the Macedonian participant for the Eurovision Song Contest 2012 were revealed, it was announced that Skopje Fest will continue being held as an independent event without being involved in the Macedonian selection process for the Eurovision Song Contest. On 15 July 2014, it was announced that Skopje Fest will return as the Macedonian national final for the Eurovision Song Contest 2015.

Winners

References

External links
 Профил страна за Скопје фест на ВБУ Музички регистар.

Eurovision Song Contest selection events
North Macedonia in the Eurovision Song Contest
Music festivals established in 1968
Pop music festivals
Rock festivals in North Macedonia
Festivals in Skopje
Music festivals in Yugoslavia
1968 establishments in Yugoslavia